Spiked may refer to:
 A drink to which alcohol, recreational drugs, or a date rape drug has been added
Spiked seltzer, seltzer with alcohol
Mickey Finn (drugs), a drink laced with a drug
 Spiked (hairstyle), hairstyles featuring spikes
 Spiked (magazine), a British Internet-based magazine
 Spike*D, stage name of German DJ Marcel Stephan, part of German DJ duo Gestört aber GeiL
 Spiked (film), a film starring Aidan Quinn
 Spiked!, a Hardy Boys novel

See also 
 Spike (disambiguation)
 Spicata (disambiguation), a Latin word with the same meaning